High Falls, on the Little River in Transylvania County, is a 125 ft (38 m) waterfall located in the DuPont State Forest, in the Blue Ridge Mountains of North Carolina.

Geology 
High Falls is located in Transylvania County on the Little River through the DuPont State Forest.  It is one of 4 major waterfalls on the Little River in this area, the others being Triple Falls, Hooker Falls, and Bridal Veil Falls. Above the falls itself, the river is level and calm. The falls consists of  a wide, ever-steepening slide over granite, and the water generally stays on the rock the whole way down. In some places, the water free-falls for a few feet or jumps off the rock face, but it is not possible to get behind the falls anywhere.

History
High Falls has been known for years to local residents.  In the 1990s, DuPont Forest was sold to the State of North Carolina, and as DuPont has completed cleanup of various areas, those areas have been made open to the public as a part of the 10,000+ acre DuPont State Forest.

Visiting High Falls
Visitors may park at the Hooker Falls parking area, and then hike the Triple Falls / High Falls Trail for roughly 1 mile (past the view for Triple Falls).  There are several views of the falls, one from an overlook that lets you view the entire falls, and another from a covered bridge area that passes near the top of the falls on Buck Forest Rd.

DuPont State Forest may also allow access to the falls by vehicle to handicapped persons.  Contact the DuPont State Forest for more information.

Nearby falls 
Triple Falls
Hooker Falls
Bridal Veil Falls
Wintergreen Falls
Connestee Falls and Batson Creek Falls
Key Falls
Glen Cannon Falls
Turley Falls

External links 
North Carolina Waterfalls
NCWaterfalls.com DuPont State Forest Page
Information on Hiking to High Falls

Protected areas of Transylvania County, North Carolina
Waterfalls of North Carolina
DuPont State Forest
Waterfalls of Transylvania County, North Carolina